Jules Bonvalet (born 18 June 1888, date of death unknown) was a Belgian horse rider who competed in the 1920 Summer Olympics and in the 1924 Summer Olympics. In 1920 he and his horse Weppelghem won the bronze medal in the team eventing, after finishing twelfth in the individual eventing competition. They also participated in the individual jumping event and finished fifteenth. Four years later he  and his horse Weppelghem finished fifth as member of the Belgian equipé in the team eventing, after finishing 16th in the individual eventing competition.

References

External links
Jules Bonvalet's profile at databaseOlympics
Jules Bonvalet's profile at Sports Reference.com

1888 births
Year of death missing
Belgian male equestrians
Equestrians at the 1920 Summer Olympics
Equestrians at the 1924 Summer Olympics
Event riders
Olympic bronze medalists for Belgium
Olympic equestrians of Belgium
Belgian show jumping riders
Olympic medalists in equestrian
Medalists at the 1920 Summer Olympics